Ambika is one of the major rivers in the Indian state of Gujarat. The river has its origins in Saputara Hill ranges in the Nasik district of Maharashtra. Ambika has a drainage area of 2715 km2 and travels 136 km before joining with the Arabian sea. Gira Waterfall  is on the Ambika River, 2 km from Waghai check post.

References

External links
 Ambika River

Rivers of Gujarat
Rivers of Maharashtra
Rivers of India